"Par Avion" is the 12th episode of the 3rd season of Lost and the 61st episode overall, making it the exact midpoint of the series. It was aired on March 14, 2007, on ABC. The episode was written by Christina M. Kim and Jordan Rosenberg and directed by Paul Edwards. The character of Claire Littleton (Emilie de Ravin) is featured in the episode's flashbacks.

Plot

Flashbacks
The episode opens with a Claire Littleton flashback.  Claire finds herself in a ruined car. She sees her mother, Carole Littleton, lying in the road, badly injured. At the hospital, Claire's Aunt Lindsey confronts Claire about her being cleaned up. A doctor tells Claire all her mother's medical expenses have been taken care of by an anonymous person.

Later, Claire discovers her mother has a visitor, Dr. Christian Shephard (John Terry). She realizes he is the one paying the hospital bills, and asks who he is. Reluctantly, Christian admits that he is her father, meaning Jack and Claire are half-siblings.

Later, Christian explains over coffee with Claire that he had a fling with her mother which resulted in Claire's birth. However, Claire's mother did not like that he had another family and told him to stay away. He reveals that the reason he wanted to talk with her is that he wants Claire to think about ending her mother's life. Claire gets angry, believing that Christian is there to "correct a mistake" he made by having Claire with her mother. She tells him paying the bill does not make him noble and leaves, after telling him she does not even know his name, and does not want to know it.

Back in Sydney, Claire visits her mother, who is still in a persistent vegetative state.  Although still in a coma, Claire reveals to her mother she is pregnant but giving away the baby. She tearfully apologizes for the accident and for all the terrible things she said to her in the car before it happened.

At the beach
Desmond Hume (Henry Ian Cusick) suggests that Charlie should go boar hunting. Claire sees a glint in a flock of seagulls. Claire realizes that the birds migrate, and that they may be tagged. She decides to capture a bird and attach a note about the crash of Flight 815 and the survivors, hoping that someone will find and read it.

After explaining her plan, Jin-Soo Kwon (Daniel Dae Kim) and Sun-Hwa Kwon (Yunjin Kim) help Claire set up a trap to capture one of the birds. Just as Jin is about to spring the trap, gunshots ring out and scare the birds away. Desmond emerges from the jungle, claiming he was on the trail of a boar. Claire knows it somehow involves Charlie. She confronts Charlie about his and Desmond's strange behavior. Although Charlie struggles with whether to tell Claire about Desmond's prediction, he instead says her plan will only give people false hope. Claire is angry and asks Charlie to leave her alone.

Claire, after seeing an argument between Desmond and Charlie, follows Desmond. He picks up a seagull from a rock and explains to Claire how he's seen that if Charlie had gone to get the bird, he would have died after falling into the sea. Claire takes the bird to Charlie and tells him she knows of the visions. Charlie and Claire release the bird, with a note explaining the circumstances of the crash.

In the jungle
Sayid Jarrah (Naveen Andrews), Kate Austen (Evangeline Lilly), John Locke (Terry O'Quinn), Danielle Rousseau (Mira Furlan) and the captured Other Mikhail Bakunin (Andrew Divoff) learn from Mikhail that the implosion at "The Swan" station sent an electromagnetic pulse which wiped out an underwater beacon. This makes it impossible for the island to be accurately located, or for anyone to return to the island. Kate asks Mikhail why the Others stay on the island if they have a way off it. Mikhail says that Kate, Locke and Sayid would not understand because they are flawed. They are not on the "list" because they are angry (looking at Locke), and weak and frightened (looking at Sayid). The list was made by a "magnificent man" who brought all the Others there. When Kate tells Mikhail that Ben Linus (Michael Emerson) is not all that great, Mikhail replies that he is not talking about Ben. Mikhail also reveals he knows their full names and begins to reveal his knowledge of Locke's paraplegic condition, but Rousseau interrupts him when she spots an endless ring of cement pylons that disappear into the jungle as far as the eye can see. Sayid believes that this is a security perimeter. Kate starts to walk through, but Sayid stops her, as he believes the sensors would be triggered. Mikhail claims the system has not worked for years, just like everything else on the island, but Locke simply grabs Mikhail and shoves him between two of the pylons. Then an odd, electronic sound rings out, trapping Mikhail, who says "thank you" to Locke. The amplitude of the sound jumps up and Mikhail begins twitching and trembling, blood drips out of his ears and saliva foams at the corners of his mouth. He falls over and spasms violently, appearing to be killed by cerebral hemorrhaging.

Sayid angrily confronts Locke about pushing Bakunin through the pylons. Locke replies that he had no way of knowing that the Others had a "sonic weapon fence." They argue about Locke's decision to enter 7-7 resulting in the destruction of the Flame station. Locke retorts that he might not have done it if Sayid had bothered to mention that the entire station was rigged with C-4. Kate asks for the axe so they can climb a tree and avoid the sonic trigger. Sayid gets the axe out of Locke's bag and discovers inside a brick of C-4 from the Flame station. Sayid immediately questions Locke's motives, asking if he really came to rescue Jack Shephard (Matthew Fox). Locke states there is no other reason for him to be there than to rescue Jack. They finish the tree bridge and Kate volunteers to climb up first. She climbs over the Pylon and reaches the other side safely. She checks Mikhail, and confirms he is dead.

Kate, Sayid, Locke and Rousseau reach the barracks where the Others are staying. Expecting to see Jack in some sort of hostage situation, Locke, Sayid and Kate are shocked to instead see him laughing and throwing a football around with Tom Friendly.

Reception
The episode garnered 12.48 million American viewers.

Awards
Emilie de Ravin submitted this episode for consideration for Outstanding Supporting Actress in a Drama Series for the 59th Primetime Emmy Awards.

References

External links

"Par Avion" at ABC

Lost (season 3) episodes
2007 American television episodes

da:Par Avion